Sandy Lake is a lake in central Catahoula Parish, Louisiana, United States.

References

Lakes of Louisiana
Bodies of water of Catahoula Parish, Louisiana